Richard dos Santos de Almeida (born 28 March 2003), commonly known as just Richard or Richard Almeida, is a Brazilian professional footballer who plays as a left back. He currently plays for Čukarički.

Club career
Richard began his career with Flamengo and made his professional debut for the club on 26 January 2022 against Volta Redonda. He came on as an 81st-minute substitute for Marcos Paulo as Flamengo drew the match 0–0.

Career statistics

References

External links

2003 births
Living people
Brazilian footballers
Association football defenders
Campeonato Brasileiro Série A players
CR Flamengo footballers
Footballers from Rio de Janeiro (city)